Scabiosa japonica is a species of flowering plant in the pincushion flower genus Scabiosa (family Caprifoliaceae), native to central and southern Japan, and introduced to the Dominican Republic. A biennial or short-lived perennial reaching , the Royal Horticultural Society considers it a good plant to attract pollinators. A number of cultivars are commercially available, including 'Blue Note', 'Blue Star', 'Blue Diamonds', 'Ritz Blue', and 'Ritz Rose'.

References

japonica
Garden plants of Asia
Endemic flora of Japan
Plants described in 1867